YMCA Hockey Club is a field hockey club based in YMCA Sports Grounds, Claremont Road, Sandymount, Dublin. They are affiliated to the Leinster Branch of the Irish Hockey Association. The club fields five men's teams and two women's teams in the Leinster Hockey leagues.

Honours
(List of honours complete for all-Ireland competitions - all others incomplete)

 Irish Senior Cup (9 wins): 1939–40, 1943–44, 1948–49, 1949–50, 1953–54, 1956–57, 1964–65, 1977–78, 1978–79
 Irish Junior Cup (1 win): 1953–54
 Irish Hockey Challenge (Ladies Hockey) (2 wins): 2008–09, 2009–10
 Leinster Senior League (Men's hockey) (11 wins): 1943–44, 1953–54, 1954–55, 1955–56, 1958–59, 1974–75, 1976–77, 1977–78, 1978–79, 1979–80, 1980–81

References

External links
YMCA Hockey Club official website

Field hockey clubs in County Dublin
1909 establishments in Ireland
Hockey
Sports clubs in Dublin (city)
Men's Irish Hockey League teams